2% out of Sync is the first album by One Thousand Motels, a collaboration project of Rat Scabies (The Damned) and Chris Constantinou (The Wolfmen, Sinead O'Connor, Adam Ant, The Mutants).

Background
The bassist/multi-instrumentalist Chris Constantinou and drummer Rat Scabies collaborated for some years as core members of The Mutants rock supergroup. When making the fourth Mutants album, Rat noticed also some other demos Chris was working on and this turned into the project One Thousand Motels, involving only the two of them (quicker and easier to put in practice, considering the logistics around The Mutants musicians as a supergroup). In September 2020, they released the first album 2% out of Sync.

Reception
The album was noticed in reviews as forging new ground with only a customary nod to the past of the two musicians. A Vive Le Rock article characterized the music as "upbeat rock songs with a twist in the lyrical tail" and the review of the same magazine gave it a 7/10 rating, describing it as a high spirited, elaborated album.

Track listing

References

2020 debut albums
Psychedelic rock albums by English artists
Punk rock albums by English artists
Cleopatra Records albums